Wehinger is surname of:

  (1853, Gestratz - 1922)
  (born 1961, Lustenau), Austrian musician
 Joe Wehinger (born 1979, Allentown, Pennsylvania), American film director and screenwriter
 Richard W. Wehinger (born 1963, Amsterdam, New York), American cartoonist

See also 
 115326 Wehinger (2003 SC221), a main-belt asteroid discovered on 2003 by D. Healy

German-language surnames